Jorawar Singh (born 7 July 1951) is an Indian basketball player. He competed in the men's tournament at the 1980 Summer Olympics.

References

External links
 

1951 births
Living people
Indian men's basketball players
Olympic basketball players of India
Basketball players at the 1980 Summer Olympics
Place of birth missing (living people)